Lixin Guo is a Chinese anthropologist and archaeologist, as well as professor at the Sun Yat-sen University in Guangzhou. He has also given lectures at the Department of History, National Chung-cheng University in Chiayi, Taiwan.

Lixin Guo research  the Panlongcheng archaeological site together with another professor of Ancient Chinese history, Olga Gorodetskaya, and can be considered an expert on Erligang and Erlitou cultures. He has also researched and written books on Shijiahe culture and other cultures of the middle Yangtze river.

Awards and Fellowships

2011.Second Prize of Guangdong Outstanding Social Scientific Research Achievement Award.

2009.National Field Archaeology Card.

2006.Third Prize of Field Archaeology  Award From State Administration of Cultural Heritage.

2004. Outstanding Thesis Award  of Najing University.

2000. Third  Prize of Guangxi Outstanding Social Scientific Research Achievement Award.

Publications

Books

2010. The Interaction and Culture Change of the Ancient Nations in the Gorges Region, Beijing: Science Press.

2006. This World in Heavens: Examination Notes on Zhnuang's Culture in Dragon Ridge, Longsheng, Guangxi. Nanning: Guangxi People Press.

2005.Initial Social Complexity in the Middle Reaches of the Yangtze River(4300B.C.~2000B.C.),Shanghai Guji Press.

1998. Anthropological Archaeology, ed. Nanning: Guangxi Nationalities Press.

Translations

2005.Location of Anthropology, Beijing: Huaxia Press.

2006.Burra Charter, in Changjiang Wen Hua Luncong, the Fourth Collection.

2009.Ethnoarchaeology in Action, Yuelu Press.

Articles

2011.GUANGZHOU LAO CHENG QU LISI WENWU ZIYUAN DIAOCHA JI KAIFA CELUE FENXI,WENHUAYICHA,No.4.

2009a.Labor Cooperation, Ritual Exchange, and Social Grouping: An Analysis of the Village Community Structure of the Zhuang Nationality in Longji, Society,Vol.29,No.6.

2009b.Interpretations of the Dengjiawan Site, Jianghan Archaeology,No.3.

2009c.Struggle Between the Life Realities and Identity to the Mainstream Society: A Study on the Logics of the House in Longji Zhuang people, Guangxi. Journal of History and Anthropology, Vol.6,No.1&2(October 2008):173-218.

2008.“Ethnoarchaeology” Recognition under Different Context, Southeast Culture, No.6.

2006a.Mortuary Contextual Analysis and Signals of Status: A Case Study on Hengling Mount (Henglingshan) Cemetery of Shang and Zhou Dynasties in Bolo County. Journal of Sun Yatsen University(Social Science Edition), Vol.46.No.5

2006b.On Late Neolithic Livelihood(Subsistence) Economy and Population Pressure in the Middle Yangtze River Valley, Huaxia Archaeology, No.3.

2006c.On the Public Archaeology. Southeast Culture,No.4.

2005a.An Analysis of Zhuang Nationality's Funeral Services in Longbei, Journal of South-central University for Nationalities: Humanities & Social Sciences,N0.1.

2005b.Research of Vat-coffin Burying at Late Shijiahe Culture Period, Sichuan Cultural Relics,No.3.2004.To Create Life: Longji Zhuang people's Activity of erecting house, Guangxi Ethnic Studies, N0.1.

2004a.On the Environmental Change of the Neolithic age in the Middle Research of the Yangtze River, Collections of Essays on Chinese History Geography, Vol.19,No.2,Jun.pp. 5–16.

2004b.Settlement mode and Social Structure of Qujialing Culture. Zhongyuan Relics.No.6.pp. 9–14.

2004c.Debates on the Cultural lineage of Late Period of Neolithic Era in the Middle Reaches of Yangtze River. JIANGHAN KAOGU. No.3.pp. 69–74.

2003.On the Prehistoric Experian Craft Production in the East  Area of Hanjiang River. Southeast Culture, No. 9.pp. 22–28.

2002.Some Reflects on the study of Chinese civilization origin, ZGWWB Nov.1.

2001.Tombs of Shijiahe Culture, Jiangsu Literature and History Study, No. 1.

2000a.Effects of Archaeological Objectives on Archaeological study: a retrospect of  archaeology. HUAXIA ARCHAEOLOGY, No.2.

2000b.The spatial distribution of Shijiahe Culture. Relics From South, No.1.

2000c.House Remains of Shijiahe Culture, ZGWWB May 3.

1998a.Research on Bronze “FU” in Ancient Yelang-state by Lead Isotopes (Second writer)   Journal of Guangxi University for Nationalities (Natural Science Edition) 2

1998b.About the Relations of Archaeology, Anthropology and History ZGWWB, Jan.21.

1998c.The Lacquer ware Craft in Ancient China, Journal of Guangxi University for Nationalities (Natural Science Edition.)N0. 3

1998d.On the Stages of Jades of the East Zhou Dynasty, Cultural Relics of Central China, No. 3

1997a.Relations among Lengshuichong-type, Beiliu-type and Linshan-type Bronze Drums, Journal of Guangxi University for Nationalities (Philosophy and Social science Edition,)No.3.

1997b.Three Aspects on Ethnoarchaeology, Relics From South 4.

1997c.Studies on the Three Area-types of Lengshuichong-type Bronze Drums, Supplement of Journal of Guangxi University for Nationalities (Philosophy and Social science Edition).

1997d.The Subsistence Economic of Shijiahe Culture, ZGWWB,Jan.12,

1997e.Awakening again, Human Beings, Ethnic Arts.No.2

1996. Exploitation of the Folk-custom Resources in Guangxi, Journal of Guangxi University for Nationalities (Philosophy and Social science Edition) No.2.

References

 歷史考古與上古文明

Living people
1968 births
Educators from Hunan
Chinese anthropologists
Chinese archaeologists
Academic staff of Sun Yat-sen University